Monroe is an unincorporated community in Amherst County, Virginia, United States.

Speed the Plough, a farm located in Monroe, was added to the National Register of Historic Places in 2007.

Climate
The climate in this area is characterized by hot, humid summers and generally mild to cool winters. According to the Köppen Climate Classification system, Monroe has a humid subtropical climate, abbreviated "Cfa" on climate maps.

In popular culture
Monroe is mentioned in a well-known American railroad song, "Wreck of the Old 97". It was written in memory of a 1903 rail disaster, when the Fast Mail, en route from Monroe to Spencer, North Carolina, derailed at the Stillhouse Trestle near Danville.

References

Unincorporated communities in Amherst County, Virginia
Unincorporated communities in Virginia